Americas High School is a high school in El Paso, Texas, United States.

History
Americas High School first opened its doors in September 1996. In order to cause minimal disruption to area high school students, the school's first classes consisted of 7th, 8th, and 9th graders. The second year, 7th grade was dropped and 10th grade was added. The 3rd year, the 8th grade was dropped and Americas was considered a standard Texas high school.  The school's first graduating class was in 2000. The school gained magnet school status with the addition of Libertas, an academy for government, law and public administration.

Students
Americas High School is mostly composed of Hispanic students, with a mixed minority of Caucasians and African Americans.

Campus
The Americas High School campus is on a 35-acre site and includes 132 classrooms, a library, computer lab, cafeteria, theater, athletic fields, and two gymnasiums.

The school's main building is arranged in an "L" shape consisting of 3 main hallway pods and 2 smaller hallways at either end.  Each of the three main pods have two floors with classrooms on either end of a diamond shaped hallway.  The second floor of each pod opens in the center to reveal the first floor. Additional classrooms have been added to the main building by filling in the space in the center on the first floor of each pod.

Like the other high schools in the Socorro Independent School District, there is not a stadium located on campus. Due to the Texas UIL realignment announced in 2013, as of 2014 Americas is a 6A school. Track/swim meets and football/soccer games are played at the SISD Student Activities Complex. A grass field is located on campus for freshmen football games and as a parade field for the NJROTC. A second grass field is used primarily for the placekickers. A concrete band practice field is in the middle of the "L". This field is also used as a marching pad for the NJROTC.

Academics
The Americas High School Libertas Academy is one of the Advanced Academic Programs offered by Socorro ISD and is geared towards students who wish to pursue a career in government and public administration or law. Along with the high schools newest edition of the Trailblazers Early College which helps student earn an associate degree while still attending regular high school.

Notable alumni

 Orlando Garcia (class of 2014), professional baseball player for the SF Giants Organization 
 Elia Esparza (class of 2010), contestant on NBC's The Voice and ABC's American Idol
 Khalid (class of 2016), singer-songwriter

References

External links
Americas High School

Socorro Independent School District high schools
High schools in El Paso, Texas